Keshwa Goundar (born 1957) is a Fijian international lawn bowler.

In 2008 he won the silver medal in the triples at the 2008 World Outdoor Bowls Championship in Christchurch along with Curtis Mar and Samuela Tuikiligana.

References

Fijian male bowls players
1957 births
Living people